Suhad Bahajri  is a Saudi chemist. She is a medical scientist and educator presently working as a professor of clinical biochemistry and clinical nutrition at the faculty of medicine at King Abdulaziz University, Jeddah.  Her research centers on diet, lifestyle and chronic diseases.

References

External links
 https://web.archive.org/web/20120306104453/http://www.smj.org.sa/DetailArticle.asp?ArticleId=506
 http://sbahijri.kau.edu.sa/CVEn.aspx?Site_ID=0000889&Lng=EN&URL=www.kau.edu.sa
 http://abamaga.kau.edu.sa/Contacts.aspx?Site_ID=140&Lng=EN&Cont=8899
 http://www.kau.edu.sa/faculties/medicine/dcbcweb/prof_suhad_matoug_bahijri.htm

Saudi Arabian women scientists
21st-century women scientists
Saudi Arabian chemists
Living people
Year of birth missing (living people)
Alumni of the University of Oxford
Alumni of the University of Wales